Benjamin Tregoe (December 23, 1927 – April 20, 2005) was co-founder of Kepner–Tregoe, a management consulting firm, where he served as chairman emeritus until his death in 2005. Tregoe helped found the company in 1958 with fellow RAND Corporation employee Charles Kepner based on their research on rational decision making and problem solving.

Education
Tregoe received a bachelor's degree from Whittier College and a PhD in sociology from Harvard University. In 1990, he received an honorary LL.D. from Whittier College. He also sat on the board of directors of The J.M. Smucker Company, Whittier College, the World Affairs Council of Philadelphia, the National Alliance of Business, and served as chairman of the Advisory Committee to the Dean of the Graduate School of Arts and Sciences of Harvard University.

Published works
In addition to lecturing, Tregoe also wrote books on management methodology and decision making. His most well-known book is The Rational Manager (1965). Other texts include Top Management Strategy (1980), Vision in Action: Putting a Winning Strategy to Work (1990), The New Rational Manager: An Updated Edition for a New World (1997), and “Analytic Processes for School Leaders” (2001).

Tregoe Education Forum
In 1993, Benjamin Tregoe established the non-profit Tregoe Education Forum (renamed TregoED in 2010). He served as its chairman until his death in 2005.

References

External links
Kepner–Tregoe
TregoED

1927 births
2005 deaths
RAND Corporation people
Harvard University alumni
Whittier College alumni